Almost an Angel is a 1990 American fantasy comedy-drama film directed by John Cornell and starring Paul Hogan. The original music score was composed by Maurice Jarre.

The film was a critical and commercial failure.

Plot
Terry Dean (Paul Hogan), a professional burglar specialized in sabotaging electronic surveillance systems, stands before his release from yet another stint in prison. Following a fellow inmate's suggestion, he decides to switch to bank robbery instead, with a special twist of his own design: first by having the security cameras record TV shows he would connect them to with a modified remote control, then entering disguised as a celebrity; the confusion over this unexpected appearance would serve to confound a detailed description.

Terry's first heist (disguised as Willie Nelson) is successful, but shortly afterwards he witnesses a young boy about to be run over by a van; he impulsively pushes the child away and is himself hit. While in the hospital, he has a nebulous experience (which may have been caused by Highway to Heaven playing on the room's TV) in which he meets God (Charlton Heston) who introduces himself as Terry's 'probation helper'. Though Terry has lived a sinful life, his last deed, impulsive as it was, has earned him a second chance to save his soul—by doing God's work as an angel in training.

After reawakening, Terry tries another bank hold-up disguised as Rod Stewart, but a stroke of luck occurs and a gang of amateur robbers interfere. As they escape, one of the thugs tries to shoot Terry, but gun was loaded with blanks by one of the other thugs. Thinking himself to be an immortal angel now, Terry reconsiders his ways, seeks advice in a church, and then he follows several 'signs' to another town. In a bar, he meets Steve Garner (Elias Koteas), an embittered young man confined to a wheelchair by a terminal sickness. To bring Steve out of his self-pity, Terry engages him in a fist-fight on equal terms, sitting fixed on a stool. Steve, taken with Terry's acceptance of him as a person, strikes up a friendship with Terry and offers him a place to stay at the youth center for children and teens, which he runs with his sister Rose (Linda Kozlowski).

Rose is at first suspicious about Terry, but Terry proves himself by slyly intimidating two drug dealers into leaving the center's premises and helping out as much as he can, and Rose gradually falls in love with him. The center itself, however, is in financial difficulties, since its backer George Bealeman (Parley Baer), while claiming himself to be a faithful Christian, refuses to provide any more funds. Since he has no angel's powers, Terry uses his technical know-how to convince Bealeman otherwise: by recording and re-editing a segment from TV evangelist Rev. Barton's (Ben Slack) telecast (which Bealeman watches reverently), and fitting the cross at the rooftop of the center's church with lighting effects, triggered by his universal remote.

At the evening where Bealeman drops by, however, two police detectives close in on Terry. Steve, who happens to overhear them, rushes off in his wheelchair to warn Terry. However, a sack of glass bottles Steve is carrying breaks and his femoral artery is cut causing him to bleed out. Just after Bealeman has left, he arrives at the center, and while Rose runs to calls an ambulance, Steve delivers his warning. Afraid of death, Steve feels lost, but is reassured he will find a place in Heaven when Terry uses the remote to trigger the lighted cross, creating a sign from God. No longer afraid of death, Steve dies in the arms of Terry and Rose.

Terry then announces that he has to leave, and trying to comfort Rose, he reveals that he is "almost an angel". Rose is understandably skeptical, but after Terry leaves, she checks his universal remote which he had left her as a keepsake, only to discover that it contains no batteries. As she stares up at the cross, it nevertheless begins to shine brilliantly on its own. Rose runs after Terry and calls out to him. Distracted, Terry slips and falls right before a speeding truck and is about to be run over. Rose is shocked to witness that the truck passes right through him, proving he has made himself an angel. Having passed his test, Terry continues on his quest to do God's work (though not without promising to return), and Rose is left comforted at last.

Cast
 Paul Hogan as Terry Dean  
 Elias Koteas as Steve Garner  
 Linda Kozlowski as Rose Garner  
 Doreen Lang as Mrs. Garner  
 Douglas Seale as Father  
 Ruth Warshawsky as Irene Bealeman  
 Parley Baer as George Bealeman  
 Michael Alldredge as Sergeant Freebody  
 David Alan Grier as Detective Bill  
 Larry Miller as Teller  
 Travis Venable as Bubba  
 Robert Sutton as Guido  
 Ben Slack as Reverend Barton, TV Evangelist  
 Troy Curvey, Jr. as Tom, The Guard  
 Eddie Frias as Young Guard Trainee
 Charlton Heston as God

Reception

Box office
The film was a commercial failure. It grossed just under $7 million in ticket sales against a $25 million budget.

Critical response
On Rotten Tomatoes it has an approval rating of 33% based on reviews from 9 critics. Audiences surveyed by CinemaScore gave the film a grade "B" on scale of A to F.

Roger Ebert of the Chicago Sun-Times gave it 2.5 out of 4 but couldn't quite recommend the film "the going gets a little thick at the end, and some of the plot developments are dumb... But that isn't to say I'm scornful of the film's special qualities and its gentle good humor."

See also
 List of films about angels

References

External links
 
 
 
 Almost an Angel at The Numbers
 Almost an Angel at Oz Movies

1990s American films
1990 films
1990 comedy-drama films
American comedy-drama films
1990s English-language films
Films scored by Maurice Jarre
Films about angels
Films about families
Films about friendship
Films directed by John Cornell
Paramount Pictures films